Whiplash Glacier is a tributary glacier flowing northwestward from Cartographers Range into the lower part of Pearl Harbor Glacier where the direction becomes east, in the Victory Mountains, Victoria Land. Named by the northern party of NZFMCAE, 1962–63, because of its characteristic shape.

References 

Glaciers of Victoria Land
Borchgrevink Coast